Allahabad-e Jahangir Khan (also Romanized as Allāhābād-e Jahāngīr Khān; also known as Allāhābād) is a village in Aliabad Rural District, in the Central District of Anbarabad County, Kerman Province, Iran. At the 2006 census, its population was 287, in 56 families.

References 

Populated places in Anbarabad County